HD 185269 b is a hot Jupiter extrasolar planet approximately 170 light years away in the constellation of Cygnus. The minimum mass is slightly less than Jupiter and the orbital period is about one week. Most hot Jupiters are thought to have undergone tidal circularization, making the eccentricity of HD 185269 b (e=0.3) unusual.
Despite having a large transit probability, none have yet been detected by various photometric monitoring campaigns.

The planet was discovered nearly simultaneously by Johnson et al. as part of a search for planets around subgiants, and by Moutou et al. as part of a search for planets around metal-rich stars (the submission dates to the journals ApJ and Astronomy and Astrophysics were separated by only 9 days).

References

External links
 

Cygnus (constellation)
Hot Jupiters
Exoplanets discovered in 2006
Giant planets
Exoplanets detected by radial velocity